Muhsin al-Barazi (1904 – 14 August 1949) was a Kurdish Syrian lawyer, academic and politician. He served a short term as a 24th Prime Minister of Syria in 1949 and was executed after a coup d'état overthrew his government.

Early life
Al-Barazi, born in Hama, was of some Kurdish descent. Educated in France, he obtained a law degree from the University of Paris in 1930 and later became a professor of law at Damascus University. In 1933 he founded, along with a number of influential Arab thinkers, the League of National Action, with the aim of countering European colonial influence. Other founding members included the historian and professor Constantin Zureiq, the philosopher Zaki al-Arsuzi and the politician Sabri al-Assali. The League was very successful in Syria and Lebanon, and called for the abolition of the French and British mandates and the economic integration of Arab countries.

Political career
Between April and September 1941, al-Barazi served as minister of education in the first cabinet of Khalid al-Azm. President Shukri al-Quwatli appointed him as his personal assistant in 1943 and by 1946, when the country regained its independence from France, al-Barazi became the president's closest advisor. He served as al-Quwatli's legal consultant, speechwriter, confidant and personal envoy to other countries.

Premiership
In March 1949, the al-Quwatli government was overthrown by a military coup led by military Chief of Staff Husni al-Zaim. Al-Barazi was the only one of al-Quwatli's associates who retained his position, becoming al-Zaim's closest advisor. In July 1949, al-Zaim appointed al-Barazi as the new prime minister. Al-Barazi used his extensive connections with Arab leaders in Saudi Arabia, Jordan, Egypt and Lebanon to garner support for the al-Zaim regime.

Negotiations with Israel
Al-Barazi was tasked with conducting secret negotiations with Israel to conclude a peace treaty between the two countries, and to discuss a possible summit between Israeli Prime Minister David Ben-Gurion and al-Zaim. The talks reached advanced levels and Israeli Foreign Minister Moshe Sharett contacted al-Barazi on 6 August 1949 to discuss a date for formal peace talks.

Syrian Social Nationalist Party

Al-Barazi was also credited with mediating an agreement between al-Zaim and Lebanese Prime Minister Riad as-Solh which extradited Antun Saadeh, founder of the Syrian Social Nationalist Party (SSNP), to Lebanon where he would be executed. In return, Lebanon gave vocal support to the al-Zaim regime and agreed to several long-term economic treaties at a July 1949 summit between both leaders. The execution of Saadeh, and al-Zaim's role in handing him over, antagonized the group of SSNP officers who later brought about al-Zaim's downfall.

Downfall and execution
Colonel Sami al-Hinnawi, along with several other SSNP officers, led a coup d'état that overthrew the al-Zaim regime on 14 August 1949. Al-Zaim and al-Barazi were both rounded up in the early hours of the dawn and executed by a firing squad at the Military Barracks, in Damascus.

His granddaughter, Arwa Damon, is a CNN senior international correspondent, and his cousin’s grandson Azad Al-Barazi is a swimmer.

References

Syrian Kurdish people
Prime Ministers of Syria
1904 births
1949 deaths
People executed by Syria by firing squad
Foreign ministers of Syria
Executed prime ministers
Executed Syrian people
Syrian ministers of interior
Syrian ministers of education
People from Hama
Syrian Kurdish politicians
20th-century Syrian lawyers
Academic staff of Damascus University
University of Lyon alumni
Al-Barazi family